The following is a list of styles or schools in Japanese martial arts.
For historical (koryū) schools, see List of koryū schools of martial arts.

Aikido
Araki-ryū
Ashihara kaikan
Bajutsu
Battōjutsu
Bōjutsu
Bujinkan
Byakuren Kaikan
Chitō-ryū
Daitō-ryū Aiki-jūjutsu
Enshin kaikan
Gensei-ryū
Gōjū-ryū
Hakkō-ryū
Hojōjutsu
Hōjutsu
Iaido
Isshin-ryu
Jōdō
Japanese kickboxing
Judo
Jūkendō
Jujutsu
Juttejutsu
Karate
Kendo
Kenjutsu
Kenpo
Kosho Shorei Ryu Kempo
Kūdō
Kusarigamajutsu
Kyokushin
Kyūdō
Kyūjutsu
Naginatajutsu
Maniwa Nen-ryū
Ninjutsu
Nippon Kempo
Okinawan kobudō
Seishinkai
Shindō jinen-ryū
Shitō-ryū
Shoot Boxing
Shoot wrestling
Shootfighting
Shōrin-ryū
Shorinji Kempo
Shorinji-Ryu
Shōtōkan-ryū
Shūdōkan
Shūkōkai
Shurikenjutsu
Sōjutsu
Sōsuishi-ryū 
Suijutsu
Sumo
Taido
Taijutsu
Takeda Ryu Nakamura Ha
Takenouchi-ryū
Tantojutsu
Tegumi
Tenshin Shōden Katori Shintō-ryū
Tenshinsho Jigen Ryu
Tessenjutsu
Togakure-ryu
Tōon-ryū
Toyama-ryū
Uechi-ryū
Wado-ryū
Yabusame
Yagyū Shingan-ryū
Yoseikan Budo
Yoseikan Karate
Yoshukai Karate

See also
Comparison of karate styles
Comparison of kobudō styles

Martial arts-related lists